Leandro Diego Armani (born 23 December 1983 in Casilda, Santa Fe) is an Argentine football striker who plays for Tiro Federal in the Torneo Argentino A.

Career
Armani played for Central Córdoba, Independiente Santa Fe, Tiro Federal and Newell's Old Boys during his first professional years. In 2010, after being the top scorer of the Argentine second division during the 2009–10 season with Tiro Federal, the press announced he had joined Godoy Cruz in the Argentine Primera División. However, the transfer did not go through. He played for Tiro Federal in the 2009 through 2014 seasons as well as the 2007/2008 season. He played for Central Cordoba Rosario in the 2013 season and Newell's Old Boys in the 2008/2009 season.

References

External links
 Argentine Primera statistics 

1983 births
Living people
People from Casilda
Sportspeople from Santa Fe Province
Argentine footballers
Association football forwards
Argentine Primera División players
Primera Nacional players
Categoría Primera A players
Central Córdoba de Rosario footballers
Tiro Federal footballers
Newell's Old Boys footballers
Independiente Santa Fe footballers
Expatriate footballers in Colombia
Argentine expatriate footballers
Argentine people of Italian descent